Ulvaria is a genus of green algae in the family Ulvaceae. It is similar to Ulva, but rather than being two cells thick, it is only one, despite its darker colour.

Species in the genus Ulvaria
 Ulvaria obscura
 Ulvaria fusca
 Ulva fenestrata

References

External links

Ulvaceae
Ulvophyceae genera